List of European television stations is a list of television stations which are notable in Europe. Notability refers to them being the dominant stations within their countries in terms of viewers.

References

 MAVISE European Television and VoD Database
 European Television Industry Market Information
 European Television Stream Online

Europe
Television stations